Coral Sea Glacier is a southern tributary of Trafalgar Glacier, which in turn is a tributary of Tucker Glacier in Victoria Land. It was named by the New Zealand Geological Survey Antarctic Expedition of 1957–58, for the Battle of the Coral Sea, a naval victory won by the United States and her allies in 1943, and because of the coralline appearance of the glacier due to an extremely broken icefall in its lower part.

References
 

Glaciers of Victoria Land
Borchgrevink Coast